Histioea proserpina is a moth of the subfamily Arctiinae. It was described by Jacob Hübner in 1827. It is found in the Amazon region.

References

 

Arctiinae
Moths described in 1827